The Dakshinamurti Stotra is a Sanskrit religious hymn (stotra) to Shiva attributed to Adi Shankara. It explains the metaphysics of the universe in the frame of the tradition of Advaita Vedanta.

In the Hindu mythology, Dakshinamurti is an incarnation of Shiva, the supreme god of knowledge. Dakshinamurti is an aspect of Shiva as a guru of all types of knowledge, and bestower of jñāna. This aspect of Shiva is his personification as the supreme or the ultimate awareness, understanding and knowledge. This form represents Shiva in his aspect as a teacher of yoga, music, and wisdom, and giving exposition on the shastras.

Unlike most of the stotras of Hindu gods, which are in the form of description of anthropomorphic forms, or mythological deeds of those gods, the Dakshinamurti Stotra takes the form of conceptual and philosophical statements. Repeated chanting and/or meditating on the meaning of these verses is expected to help a spiritual practitioner of Advaita Vedanta get thoroughly established in an Advaitic experience.

The Dakshinamurti Stotra is arguably the most important small verse to be attributed to Adi Shankara. In a compilation of ten stanzas there is a concise and vivid description of the philosophical significance of the form of Shiva, giving the very essence of the Indian idea of epistemology. It differs from every other attempt in a very basic sense, in that it is holistic rather than purely reductionist.

References 

Hindu texts
Sanskrit texts
Adi Shankara
Advaita Vedanta
Shaiva texts
Advaita Vedanta texts